Minot is a section of Scituate, Massachusetts.  Minot's ZIP Code is 02055.

Minot is a beach community in Scituate. It is fondly regarded as the best beach in Scituate. It is part North Scituate and is further divided into an area of private property called "The Glades Estate,"   
Minot consists of the homes from the intersection of Hatherly Road and Gannett Road (known as "The Lights") to the ocean and includes Surfside Road, Seagate Circle, Mitchell Ave & Ln, and Pond View Avenue.

Two beaches are in Minot. North Scituate beach, the southernmost beach, is bordered to the south by Egypt Beach (part of the Egypt section of Scituate) and to the North by the second beach, Minot.

Minot has its own post office with limited hours. The town of Scituate is currently planning to re-open a Minot firestation.

Public school children in Minot attend Wampatuck Elementary School, Lester J. Gates Intermediate School, and Scituate High School, and samoset school

Minot has no businesses. Hatherly Country Club, a private club  and golf course for members only, is located on Hatherly Road, spread across Minot and North Scituate.

External links
Google Map
Scituate Historical Society page on Minot

Populated places in Plymouth County, Massachusetts